Man, Play and Games is the influential 1961 book by the French sociologist Roger Caillois, (French Les jeux et les hommes, 1958)  on the sociology of play and games or, in Caillois' terms, sociology derived from play. Caillois interprets many social structures as elaborate forms of games and much behaviour as a form of play.

Summary 
Caillois builds critically on the theories of Johan Huizinga, adding a more comprehensive review of play forms. Caillois disputes Huizinga's emphasis on competition in play. He also notes the considerable difficulty in defining play, concluding that play is best described by six core characteristics:
 It is free, or not obligatory.
 It is separate (from the routine of life), occupying its own time and space.
 It is uncertain, so that the results of play cannot be pre-determined and so that the player's initiative is involved.
 It is unproductive in that it creates no wealth and ends as it begins.
 It is governed by rules that suspend ordinary laws and behaviours and that must be followed by players.
 It involves make-believe that confirms for players the existence of imagined realities that may be set against 'real life'.

Caillois argues that we can understand the complexity of games by referring to four play forms and two types of play (ludus and paidia): 
 Agon, or competition. E.g. Chess is an almost purely agonistic game.
 Alea, or chance. E.g. Playing a slot machine is an almost purely aleatoric game.
 Mimicry, or mimesis, or role playing.
 Ilinx (Greek for "whirlpool"), or vertigo, in the sense of altering perception, dizziness, disorder, or loss-of-control. E.g. taking hallucinogens, riding roller coasters, children spinning until they fall down.

Games and play combine these elements in various ways.
Examples:
 Poker features both alea, the random shuffling of cards, and agon, the strategic decisions of discarding cards and betting.
 Collectible card games combine alea (the random shuffling of decks and the distribution of cards in booster packs), agon (competition with rules and strategies) and mimesis (cards refer to imaginary beings the player controls in a fictional world).
 Dancing is an ilinx activity, which can be combined with mimesis to portray characters, or with agon in competitive dance.
 Spectator sports combine the agon of the players with mimesis on the part of the spectators, who self-insert and identify with certain players on the field.

Caillois also places forms of play on a continuum from ludus, structured activities with explicit rules (games), to paidia, unstructured and spontaneous activities (playfulness), although in human affairs the tendency is always to turn paidia into ludus, and that established rules are also subject to the pressures of paidia. It is this process of rule-forming and re-forming that may be used to account for the apparent instability of cultures.

Caillois also emphasizes that paidia and alea cannot coexist, as games of chance are inherently games of restraint and waiting for an external event. Likewise, ludus and ilinx are incompatible, as there are no structured rules in the state of disorientation. Any rules applied are solely to put a brake on the ilinx so as not to turn it into panic.

Like Huizinga, Caillois sees a tendency for a corruption of the values of play in modern society as well as for play to be institutionalised in the structures of society. For example agon is seen as a cultural form in sports, in an institutional form as economic competition and as a corruption in violence and trickery; Alea is seen as a cultural form in lotteries and casinos, as an institutional form in the stock market and as a corruption in superstition and astrology; mimicry is seen as cultural form in carnivals and theatre, as institutional form in uniforms and ceremonies and as corruption in forms of alienation; and ilinx is seen as cultural form in climbing and skiing, as institutional form in professionals requiring control of vertigo and as corruption in drugs and alcoholism.

Notes

External links 
 Man, Play and Games on Google Books

1958 non-fiction books
French non-fiction books
Play (activity)
Books about game theory
Books about games
Game studies